The Japan women's national handball team is the national handball team of Japan and is controlled by the Japan Handball Association.

Results

Summer Olympics
1976 – 5th
2020 – 12th

World Championship
1962 – 9th
1965 – 7th
1971 – 9th
1973 – 10th
1975 – 10th
1986 – 14th
1995 – 13–16th
1997 – 17th
1999 – 17th
2001 – 20th
2003 – 16th
2005 – 18th
2007 – 19th
2009 – 16th
2011 – 14th
2013 – 14th
2015 – 19th
2017 – 16th
2019 – 10th
2021 – 11th
2023 – Qualified

Asian Championship
1987 – 3rd
1989 – 3rd
1991 – 2nd
1993 – 4th
1995 – 3rd
1997 – 3rd
1999 – 3rd
2000 – 2nd
2002 – 4th
2004 – 1st
2006 – 3rd
2008 – 3rd
2010 – 4th
2012 – 3rd
2015 – 2nd
2017 – 2nd
2018 – 2nd
2021 – 2nd
2022 – 2nd

Other Competitions

Carpathian Trophy 
2019 – 3rd

Current squad
Squad for the 2021 World Women's Handball Championship.

Head coach: Shigeo Kusumoto

References

External links

IHF profile

National team
Women's national handball teams
Handball